Volodymyr Arkadiyovych Hapon (born 3 August 1979 in Lutsk) is a Ukrainian football coach and a former player. He currently works as a coach of FC Volyn Lutsk.

He made his debut in the Ukrainian Premier League at the age of 15 years, 9 months and 17 days, which is the second-youngest after Yuriy Fenin.

He played only a single game for the Ukraine national under-21 football team against Poland in 2000 coming as a substitute for Volodymyr Yaksmanytskyi.

References

External links
 

1979 births
Footballers from Lutsk
Living people
Ukrainian footballers
FC Volyn Lutsk players
Ukrainian Premier League players
Ukraine under-21 international footballers
FC Chornomorets Odesa players
FC Chornomorets-2 Odesa players
FC Elista players
Ukrainian expatriate footballers
Expatriate footballers in Russia
Ukrainian expatriate sportspeople in Russia
Russian Premier League players
FC Nyva Vinnytsia players
FC Naftovyk-Ukrnafta Okhtyrka players
FC Desna Chernihiv players
Ukrainian football managers
Association football midfielders
Sportspeople from Volyn Oblast